A Dead Heavy Day is the third studio album by the Finnish gothic metal band Poisonblack. It was released on 1 September 2008 by Century Media Records.

Track listing

Digipak limited edition bonus DVD 
Making of A Dead Heavy Day
Live at Gloria, Oulu, for Radio Mega, 27 March 2008, semi acoustic:

Rush video-clip

Band members 
Ville Laihiala – lead vocals, guitars
Janne Markus – guitars
Marco Sneck – keyboards
Antti Remes – bass
Tarmo Kanerva – drums

References

External links 

 

2008 albums
Poisonblack albums
Century Media Records albums